Edonis helena is a species of dragonfly in the family Libellulidae, and is the only species in the genus Edonis. It occurs from southern Brazil to northeastern Argentina.

References

Libellulidae
Taxa named by James George Needham
Insects described in 1905